is a private university in Seki, Gifu, Japan. It is run by an educational foundation, Jinno Institute (神野学園).

History 
It started in 1973 as a vocational school, Kokusai Igaku Sougou Gijutsu Gakuin (国際医学総合技術学院), which became a junior college in 1983, Gifu College of Medical Technology (岐阜医療技術短期大学). It was awarded full university status in 2006. The graduate school opened in 2016.

Faculties and graduate school

Undergraduate
  School of Health Sciences 
 Faculty of Medical Technology
 Faculty of Radiological Technology
 Faculty of Nursing

Postgraduate
  Faculty of Midwifery (Diploma)
  Graduate School of Health and Medicine (MSc)

References

External links
 Official website 
 Official page in Jinno Institute website 

Educational institutions established in 2006
Private universities and colleges in Japan
Universities and colleges in Gifu Prefecture
Seki, Gifu
Medical schools in Japan
2006 establishments in Japan